Gunning Shire was a local government area in New South Wales  centered on Gunning, New South Wales north of the Australian Capital Territory until February 2004, when the local government organisation was absorbed into newly created  Palerang Council and  Upper Lachlan Shire.

History 
The Gunning region was originally home to two Australian Aboriginal language groups, the Gundungurra people in the north and the Ngunnawal people in the south and was first explored by Europeans in 1820, and settled the next year by Hamilton Hume. In 1824, Hume and William Hovell left here to discover the overland route to Port Phillip Bay where Melbourne is sited. The town of Dalton, is known as the earthquake center of New South Wales. In 2004 the shire was absorbed into Upper Lachlan Shire.

References

Former local government areas of New South Wales